James Ramsey Garrett (1817 – 1855) was an Irish ornithologist.

James Garrett was a solicitor at 3 Donegall Square East Belfast. He was a leading member of the Belfast Natural History Society. 
Under the will of William Thompson Robert Patterson and Garrett were entrusted with the completion of Thompson's Natural History of Ireland.

References
Robert Lloyd Praeger Some Irish naturalists: A Biographical Note-book W.Tempest, Dundalgan Press, Dundalk, 1949

External links
Letter from Garrett to Patterson
Obit. Natural History Review 1855

Irish ornithologists
1855 deaths
1817 births